Tom Brown may refer to:

Sports

American football
Tom Brown (tackle) (1890–1972), American football player
Tom Brown (end) (1921–2013), American football player in the NFL
Tom Brown (safety) (born 1940), American athlete who played football in the NFL and baseball in MLB
Tom Brown (wide receiver) (born 1963), American football player in the NFL
Tom Brown (running back) (born 1964), American football player in the NFL
Tom Brown (guard) (born 1936), American football player in the CFL

Other sports
Tom Brown (outfielder) (1860–1927), American baseball player and manager
Tom Brown (bowls) (1915–1980), England lawn bowls competitor
Tom Brown (footballer, born 1919) (1919–2000), Scottish footballer
Tom Brown (tennis) (1922–2011), American tennis player
Tom Brown (pitcher) (born 1949), American baseball pitcher
Tom Brown (footballer, born 1968), Scottish former footballer
Tom Brown (rugby, born 1983), English rugby union and rugby league player
Tom Brown (rugby union, born 1990), Scottish rugby union player

Arts and entertainment
Tom Brown (satirist) (1662–1704), English satirical writer
Tom Brown (trombonist) (1888–1958), American jazz trombonist and bandleader
Tom Brown (actor) (1913–1990), American film and television actor
Tom E. Brown (born 1967), American director, screenwriter, producer, and actor
Tom Brown (chef) (born 1987), British chef

Others
Tom Brown (British Army soldier) (1705–1746), hero of the Battle of Dettingen
Thomas Mott Osborne (alias "Tom Brown", 1859–1926), American prison warden
Tom Brown (politician) (1886–1970), British Labour MP
Tom Brown (police officer) (1889–1959), American police chief of St. Paul, Minnesota
Tom Brown (anarchist) (1900–1974), British anarcho-syndicalist 
Tom Brown (engineer) (1933–2019), Scottish engineer
Tom C. Brown (born 1933), American politician in the state of Florida
Tom Brown (bishop) (born 1943), New Zealand Anglican bishop
Tom Brown Jr. (born 1950), American naturalist, tracker, survivalist, and author
Tom Brown (chemist) (born 1952), British chemistry professor
Tom Brown (apple hunter), North Carolina-based orchardist and apple hunter

Other uses
Tom Brown (character), fictional character introduced in Tom Brown's Schooldays
Tom Brown (breakfast food), a Ghanaian breakfast porridge made from roasted maize

See also
Thomas Brown (disambiguation)
Tommy Brown (disambiguation)
Thomas Browne (disambiguation)
Tom Browne (disambiguation)
Tom Browning (born 1960), American baseball player